Mavrovo and Rostuša is a municipality in western North Macedonia. The municipal seat is located in the village of Rostuša. This municipality is part of the Polog Statistical Region.

Geography
The municipality borders Gostivar Municipality to the north, Kičevo Municipality to the east, Debar Municipality to the south and Albania to the west.

Demographics

According to the last national census from 2021, this municipality has 5,042 inhabitants. Ethnic groups in the municipality include:

Mother tongues declared, per the 2021 census, include the following:
Macedonian: 4,120 (81.2%)
Persons for whom data are taken from administrative sources: 405 (8.0%)
Albanian:  355 (7.0%)
Turkish: 138 (2.7%)
Others: 24 (0.5%)

Notable people
Josif Bageri
Čede Filipovski Dame
Golub Janić
Josif Mihajlović Jurukovski
Doksim Mihailović
Georgi Pulevski
Aleksandar Sarievski
Kuzman Sotirović
Vuča Žikić
Parteniy Zografski
Lazar Ličenoski
Slavko Brezoski

See also
 Mavrovo National Park

References

External links
 Official website

 
Polog Statistical Region
Municipalities of North Macedonia